The Fundamentalist Church of Jesus Christ of Latter-Day Saints (FLDS Church) is a religious sect of the fundamentalist Mormon denominations whose members practice polygamy. The fundamentalist Mormon movement emerged in the early 20th century, when its founding members were excommunicated from the Church of Jesus Christ of Latter-day Saints (LDS Church), largely because of their refusal to abandon the practice of plural marriage after it was renounced in the "Second Manifesto" (1904). The FLDS Church as a distinct group traces its origins to the 1950s in the Short Creek community (now the twin cities of Hildale, Utah and Colorado City, Arizona), where the group is still based.

The FLDS Church has been designated as a hate group by the Southern Poverty Law Center: citing leader Warren Jeffs' opinions on "Blacks, women, gays, violence and the end of the world"; and called them "a white supremacist, homophobic, antigovernment, totalitarian cult". The group is considered a polygamous cult.

Locations
The FLDS Church headquarters were originally located in what was then known as Short Creek in Arizona, on the southern border of Utah. The settlement eventually expanded into Utah and became incorporated as the twin municipalities of Hildale, Utah, and Colorado City, Arizona. The historic location of the church was in Hildale and Colorado City, but the church also has a long-standing colony in Bountiful, British Columbia. In 2004, news reports suggested a possible shift of the church's headquarters to Eldorado, Texas, where a temple had been built by FLDS Church members.

Membership
The exact number of members of the FLDS Church is not known, due to the relatively closed cultish nature of the organization. It was estimated to have 6,000 to 10,000 members residing in the sister cities of Hildale, Utah and Colorado City, Arizona; Eldorado, Texas; Westcliffe, Colorado; Mancos, Colorado; Creston and Bountiful, British Columbia; and Pringle, South Dakota. However, in recent years, membership has suffered due to purges by Warren Jeffs, and members leaving. There are also developing communities near Benjamín Hill, Sonora (south of Nogales in the state of Sonora); Ensenada, Baja California (south of Tijuana); and Boise City, Oklahoma. Members of the FLDS Church have owned machine shops that have sold airplane components to the United States Air Force and the Defense Logistics Agency; from 1998 to 2007 the receipts from these components totaled more than US$1.7 million.

History

Origins 

The residents in the area of Hildale and Colorado City have a long history of practicing polygamy, dating to the mid-19th century. It is taught in the community that Brigham Young, then president of the LDS Church, once visited the area and said "this will someday be the head and not the tail of the church. This will be the granaries of the Saints. This land will produce in abundance sufficient wheat to feed the people." The twin cities were once known as Short Creek, officially founded in 1913 as a ranching community.

The FLDS traces its claim to spiritual authority to accounts, starting with a statement published in 1912 by Lorin C. Woolley, of a purported 1886 divine revelation to then-LDS Church President John Taylor. They see the 1886 Revelation as precluding validity of the 1890 Manifesto against new plural marriages by church members, issued by Wilford Woodruff, whom the LDS Church recognizes as Taylor's successor. After the formal abandonment of plural marriage by the LDS Church, many members around Short Creek and elsewhere continued, and even solemnized, plural marriages. In 1904 the LDS Church issued the Second Manifesto, and eventually excommunicated those who continued to solemnize or enter into new plural marriages.

Short Creek soon became a gathering place for polygamist former members of the LDS Church. In 1935, the LDS Church excommunicated the Mormon residents of Short Creek who refused to sign an oath renouncing polygamy. Following this, John Y. Barlow began to lead a group of Mormon fundamentalists who were dedicated to preserving the practice of plural marriage. The location on the Utah–Arizona border was thought to be ideal for the group because it allowed them to avoid state raids by moving across the state line. Ben Bistline has called it a "popular misconception" that the spot was chosen because it straddled the state line, rather than being where the property offered to the Priesthood Council happened to be.

Some of the locally prominent men in Short Creek, after being excommunicated by the LDS Church, later became leaders of the Mormon fundamentalist movement, including Lorin C. Woolley, J. Leslie Broadbent, John Y. Barlow, Charles Zitting, Joseph White Musser, LeGrand Wooley, and Louis A. Kelsch. In 1932, these men created the organization known as the Council of Friends, a group of seven high priests that was said to be the governing priesthood body on Earth. The Council of Friends became the governing ecclesiastical body over the Mormon fundamentalists at Short Creek.

The early years of the movement were contentious and saw many differing interpretations and opinions among leaders as to how plural marriage should be practised. These contentions eventually led to the subsequent schisms that created the multiple Mormon fundamentalist organizations that now exist, including the FLDS Church, the Apostolic United Brethren, and the Latter-day Church of Christ or Kingston group. It is commonly believed by all of these sects that the early leaders of the fundamentalist movement claimed to receive revelations from God commanding that plural marriage should not cease.

One researcher has suggested that the concept of the FLDS as a separate church entity did not fully arise until a 1987 lawsuit when the full name of the church first appears. According to this interpretation, the original authority conferred by Lorin C. Wooley was only for the purpose of initiating plural marriages, not for the establishment of a new church, and many early Short Creek polygamists continued to regard the LDS Church as authoritative but "out of order" on the matter of polygamy. Such members held hope that the LDS Church would one day come back "into order" and re-establish the practice of polygamy.

FLDS splinter groups
In 1984, a schism formed within the FLDS Church just before the death of Leroy S. Johnson. A small group of FLDS (known as the Centennial Park group) took issue with the "one-man rule" doctrine that altered the leadership structure of the church and that was implemented fully when Rulon Jeffs assumed his position as sole leader of the organization. These followers took up residence just south of Colorado City, in Centennial Park, Arizona, calling themselves "The Work of Jesus Christ," or "The Work" for short.

Also in 2002, after Warren Jeffs assumed leadership, Winston Blackmore, who had been serving in Canada as the Bishop of Bountiful for the FLDS Church, was excommunicated by Jeffs in an apparent power struggle. This led to a split within the community in Bountiful, British Columbia, with an estimated 700 FLDS members leaving the church to follow Blackmore.

Leaders
The FLDS Church has been led by a succession of men regarded as prophets, who are believed to have been called by God to lead. The first leader of the FLDS Church was John Y. Barlow, who led the community of Short Creek until his death on December 29, 1949. He was succeeded by Joseph White Musser, who was the church's leader during a government crackdown on polygamy known as the Short Creek raid, in 1953, in which all the FLDS Church members of Short Creek were arrested, including 236 children.

Musser led the community until a contentious appointment of Rulon Allred to a high position of authority in 1951 angered some members of the Short Creek community. Musser had appointed Allred to be his successor, but Allred was not accepted as his successor by the Short Creek community. This led to a schism, with many followers breaking off and joining Allred; this offshoot became known as the Apostolic United Brethren. The core group in the Short Creek area instead followed Charles Zitting as its leader.

Zitting died in 1954 and Leroy S. Johnson was chosen to lead the church in Short Creek. Johnson led the FLDS Church until his death in 1986. He was succeeded by Rulon Jeffs, who assumed the position of Prophet, a title his predecessor refused to use. In Jeffs' later years, his poor health led to one of his sons, Warren Jeffs, serving as leader of the church in his stead, and upon Rulon's death in September 2002, Warren Jeffs became leader of the FLDS Church. However, immediately after the state of Utah convicted him of being an accomplice to rape, it was widely reported in the press that Warren Jeffs resigned his leadership of the FLDS Church, though the statement made by his attorneys only addresses Jeffs' resignation from his fiduciary post as "President of the Corporation of the President of the Fundamentalist Church of Jesus Christ of Latter Day Saints, Inc."

In early 2011, Jeffs reasserted his leadership of the church. Since no public statements had been made by church officials indicating Jeff's successor, it is not known who led the FLDS Church in the interim, although it is possible that Warren Jeffs continued to be leader during this period.

Previous heads
 Leroy S. Johnson died aged 98, 1954–1986
 Rulon T. Jeffs died aged 93, 1986–2002

Current head
The following individuals held or claimed high leadership positions as of late 2011:
 Warren Jeffs, as living incumbent, disputed, 2002 — c. 2007?; since February 2011, imprisoned in 2007, sentenced to life plus 20 years with Lyle Jeffs as the designated, future successor
 William E. Jessop, 2007–2010, claimant to the succession
 Merril Jessop, 2007–Feb 2011 de facto leader[discuss]
 Wendell L. Nielsen, 2010–January 28, 2011, president of the church's corporate entity.[discuss]
 Lyle Jeffs, brother of Warren Jeffs and former head and bishop of the church until his brother removed him from these posts in 2012, as reported by the Salt Lake Tribune
Bishops 
 James Oler – Canada

Legal trouble and leadership struggles

Polygamy is illegal in all 50 states of the United States as well as Canada and Mexico. Attempts to overturn the illegality based on right of religious freedom have been unsuccessful. In 2003, the church received increased attention from the state of Utah when police officer Rodney Holm, a member of the church, was convicted of unlawful sexual conduct with a 16- or 17-year-old and one count of bigamy for his marriage to and impregnation of plural wife Ruth Stubbs. The conviction was the first legal action against a member of the FLDS Church since the Short Creek raid.

After seeing high-profile FLDS Church critic Flora Jessop on the ABC television program Primetime Live on March 4, 2004, concerned Eldorado residents contacted Jessop. She investigated, and on March 25, 2004, Jessop held a press conference in Eldorado confirming that the new neighbors were FLDS Church adherents. On May 18, 2004, Schleicher County Sheriff David Doran and his Chief Deputy visited Colorado City, and the FLDS Church officially acknowledged that the Schleicher County property would be a new base for the church. A local newspaper, the Eldorado Success, reported that the temple foundation was dedicated January 1, 2005 by Warren Jeffs.

On January 10, 2004, Dan Barlow (the mayor of Colorado City) and about 20 other men were excommunicated from the church and stripped of their wives and children (who would be reassigned to other men), and the right to live in the town. The same day two teenage girls reportedly fled the towns with the aid of activist Flora Jessop, who advocates plural wives' escape from polygamy. The two girls, Fawn Broadbent and Fawn Holm, soon found themselves in a highly publicized dispute over their freedom and custody. After the allegations against their parents were proven false, Flora helped them flee state custody together on February 15, and they ended up in Salt Lake City at Fawn Holm's brother Carl's house.

In October 2004, Flora Jessop reported that David Allred purchased a  parcel of land near Mancos, Colorado, (midway between Cortez and Durango) about the same time he bought the Schleicher County property. Allred told authorities the parcel was to be used as a hunting retreat.

In July 2005, eight men of the church were indicted for sexual contact with minors. All of them turned themselves in to police in Kingman, Arizona, within days.

On July 29, 2005, Brent W. Jeffs filed suit accusing three of his uncles, including Warren Jeffs, of sexually assaulting him when he was a child. The suit also named the FLDS Church as a defendant. On August 10, former FLDS Church member Shem Fischer, Dan Fischer's brother, added the church and Warren Jeffs as defendants to a 2002 lawsuit claiming he was illegally fired because he no longer adhered to the faith. Fischer, who was a salesman for a wooden cabinetry business in Hildale, claimed church officials interfered with his relationship with his employer and blacklisted him. The district court granted summary judgment in favor of the company and found that Fischer was not fired from his job, but quit instead. The district court ruling was overturned in part on the basis that Fischer was discriminated against on the basis of religion when he reapplied for his position and was denied employment because he had left the FLDS church. The parties eventually settled the case for an agreed payment of damages to Shem Fischer. 

In July 2005, six young adult "Lost Boys" who claimed they were cast out of their homes on the Utah–Arizona border to reduce competition for wives, filed suit against the FLDS Church. "The [boys] have been excommunicated pursuant to that policy and practice and have been cut off from family, friends, benefits, business and employment relationships, and purportedly condemned to eternal damnation", their suit says. "They have become 'lost boys' in the world outside the FLDS community."

On May 7, 2006, the FBI named Warren Jeffs to its Ten Most Wanted Fugitives list on charges of unlawful flight to avoid prosecution.

On August 28, 2006, Warren Jeffs was captured on Interstate 15 just north of Las Vegas, Nevada, after a routine traffic stop. Jeffs was tried in St. George, Utah, and a jury found him guilty of two counts of being an accomplice to rape.

The mayor of Colorado City, Terrill C. Johnson, was arrested on May 26, 2006, for eight fraudulent vehicle registration charges for registering his vehicles in a different state than he lived, which is a felony. He was booked into Purgatory Correctional Facility in Hurricane, Utah, and was released after paying the $5,000 bail in cash.

From 2007 to 2011, the leadership of the FLDS Church was unclear. On November 20, 2007, after the conviction of then leader Warren Jeffs, attorneys for Jeffs released the following statement: "Mr. Jeffs resigned as President of The Fundamentalist Church of Jesus Christ of Latter-Day Saints, Inc." This statement does not address his position as prophet of the church, but merely addressed his resignation from his fiduciary post as president of the corporation belonging to the FLDS Church. According to a Salt Lake Tribune telephone transcript, there is evidence that, when incarcerated, Warren Jeffs made statements naming William E. Jessop, a former first counselor, as his successor or, alternatively, that Jeffs had told Jessop on January 24, 2007, that he (Jeffs) had never been the rightful leader of the FLDS. Many press accounts have suggested that Merril Jessop, who has been leading the Eldorado compound, is the de facto leader of the church. Additionally, on January 9, 2010, documents filed with the Utah Department of Commerce name Wendell L. Nielsen as the president of the sect. The FLDS incorporation charter does not require the church president to be its prophet. However, traditionally the President of the FLDS church was also the religious head. FLDS leaders have refused to clarify who is considered the prophet of the FLDS church. To add additional confusion to the issue of succession, a 2012 CNN documentary said that Jeffs still led the church from prison.

Prior to November 20, 2007, the church was being led by Jeffs, who succeeded his father, Rulon Jeffs, in 2002. For nearly two years, Warren Jeffs had been wanted on sex-crimes charges. From May 2006 until his arrest in August 2006, he was on the FBI's Ten Most-Wanted List. On September 25, 2007, Jeffs was found guilty of two counts of being an accomplice to rape and was sentenced to ten years to life in prison. This conviction was later overturned. On January 28, 2011, Jeffs again asserted his leadership of the denomination. Warren Jeffs was later sentenced to life in prison plus 20 years and fined $10,000 after being convicted on charges of aggravated sexual assault and sexual assault.

Short Creek raid

In the morning of July 26, 1953, 102 Arizona state police officers and National Guard soldiers raided the fundamentalist Mormon community of Short Creek, Arizona. They arrested the entire populace, including 236 children. Of those 236 children, 150 were not allowed to return to their parents for more than two years. Other parents never regained custody of their children.

The Short Creek raid was the largest mass arrest of polygamists in American history, and it received a great deal of press coverage. After the raid, polygamists continued to live there; in 1960, Short Creek was renamed Colorado City.

April 2008 raid

In April 2008, acting on the outcry of an alleged teen victim of physical and sexual abuse at the FLDS compound in Schleicher County, Texas, Texas Child Protective Services and Department of Public Safety officers entered the compound to serve search and arrest warrants and carry out court orders designed to protect children. Over the course of several days, from April 3 through April 10, Texas CPS removed 439 children under age 18 from the church's YFZ Ranch, while law enforcement, including Texas Rangers, executed their search and arrest warrants on the premises. The April 2008 events at the YFZ Ranch generated intense press coverage in the U.S., especially in the Southwest, and also garnered international attention.

On April 18, 2008, following a two-day hearing, Judge Barbara Walther of the 51st Judicial District Court ordered all of the FLDS children to remain in the temporary custody of Child Protective Services. Judge Walther's ruling was subsequently reversed by the 3rd Court of Appeals in Austin, Texas in a ruling that Texas CPS was not justified in removing every child from the ranch. The 3rd Court of Appeals granted mandamus relief and ordered the trial court to vacate the portion of its order giving CPS temporary custody of the FLDS children. CPS petitioned the Texas Supreme Court requesting that the 3rd Court of Appeals' ruling be overturned, but the Texas Supreme Court, in a written opinion issued May 29, 2008, declined to overturn the ruling of the 3rd Court of Appeals.

The abuse hotline calls that prompted the raid are now believed to have been made by Rozita Swinton, a non-FLDS woman with no known connection to the FLDS community in Texas. Nevertheless, the search warrants executed at the YFZ compound were determined by the court to have been legally issued and executed, and the evidence seized cannot be excluded on the basis that the initial outcry may have been a hoax.

In November 2008, 12 FLDS men were charged with offenses related to alleged underage marriages conducted during the years since the sect built the YFZ Ranch. As of June 2010, six FLDS members had been convicted of felonies and received sentences ranging from seven to 75 years' imprisonment.

Prosecutions in Texas
On November 5, 2009, a Schleicher County, Texas jury found Raymond Merril Jessop, 38, guilty of sexual assault of a child. According to evidence admitted at trial, Jessop sexually assaulted a 16-year-old girl to whom he had been "spiritually married" when the girl was 15 years old. The same jury sentenced Jessop to 10 years in prison and assessed a fine of $8,000.

On December 18, 2009, a Schleicher County, Texas jury found Allan Keate guilty of sexual assault of a child. Keate fathered a child with a 15-year-old girl. According to documents admitted at trial, Keate had also given three of his own daughters away in "spiritual" or "celestial" marriage, two of them at 15 and one at 14, to older men. The youngest of the three went to Warren Jeffs. He was sentenced to 33 years in prison. The conviction and sentence was later upheld on appeal.

On January 22, 2010, Michael George Emack pleaded no contest to sexual assault charges and was sentenced to seven years in prison. He married a 16-year-old girl at YFZ Ranch on August 5, 2004. She gave birth to a son less than a year later.

On March 17, 2010, a Tom Green County, Texas jury found Merril Leroy Jessop guilty of sexual assault of a child after deliberating only one hour. Evidence admitted at the criminal trial proved beyond a reasonable doubt that Jessop, 35, sexually assaulted a 15-year-old girl while living at the FLDS Ranch in Schleicher County, Texas. The jury sentenced Jessop to 75 years in prison and assessed a $10,000 fine.

April 2010 raid
On April 6, 2010, Arizona officials executed search warrants at governmental offices of the towns of Colorado City, Arizona and Hildale, Utah. According to one report, the warrants involved the misuse of funds and caused the Hildale Public Safety Department to be shut down. According to another report, city personnel and volunteers were ordered out of the buildings while the search was being conducted, prompting protests from Colorado City Fire Chief Jake Barlow. Despite these protests, public safety did not appear to be affected, as the county law enforcement agencies involved routed calls for emergency service through the county offices. A search warrant was also executed at Jake Barlow's residence.

The search warrant affidavit states that the Mohave County District Attorney sought records relating to personal charges on an agency credit card from the Colorado City Fire Department under the open records laws. Chief Barlow indicated that there were no personal charges, therefore there were no records to disclose. Records obtained by subpoena from the banks involved showed a series of purchases made by Chief Barlow and Darger that are questionable, including diapers, child's clothing, and food, although the firefighters are not fed by the department.

After the raid

In November 2012, the Texas Attorney General's Office instituted legal proceedings to seize the FLDS ranch property in Eldorado, Texas. The basis for the forfeiture and seizure proceeding was cited as the use of FLDS property as "...a rural location where the systemic sexual assault of children would be tolerated without interference from law enforcement authorities", therefore, the property is contraband and subject to seizure. On April 17, 2014, Texas officials took physical possession of the property.

In June 2014, the Arizona Office of the Attorney General filed a motion in U.S. District Court seeking to dissolve the local police forces and "the disbandment of the Colorado City, Arizona/Hildale, Utah Marshal's Office and the appointment of a federal monitor over municipal functions and services." As the basis for the legal proceeding, the Arizona Attorney General stated that "[t]he disbandment of the Colorado City/Hildale Marshal's Office is necessary and appropriate because this police department has operated for decades, and continues to operate, as the de facto law enforcement arm of the FLDS Church."

Distinctive doctrines

Plural marriage and placement marriage

The FLDS Church teaches the doctrine of plural marriage, which states that a man having multiple wives is ordained of and a commandment by God; the doctrine requires it in order for a man to receive the highest form of salvation. In the church it is generally believed that a man should have a minimum of three wives in order to fulfill this requirement. Connected with this doctrine is the patriarchal doctrine, the belief that wives are required to be subordinate to their husbands.

The church currently practices placement marriage, whereby a young woman of marriageable age is assigned a husband by revelation from God to the leader of the church, who is regarded as a prophet. The prophet elects to take wives from men as well as give wives to men according to their worthiness. This practice is also called the law of placing.

Dress
In general, women do not cut their hair short or wear makeup, trousers, or any skirt above the knees. Men wear plain clothing, usually long-sleeved collared shirt and full-length trousers. Men and women are forbidden to have any tattoos or body piercings. Women and girls usually wear pastel-colored homemade long-sleeved prairie dresses, with hems between ankle and mid-calf, along with long stockings or trousers underneath, usually keeping their hair coiffed.

Brooke Adams of The Salt Lake Tribune said "Photographs from the 1953 raid on Short Creek, now the twin towns of Hildale, Utah and Colorado City, Arizona, show men, women and children dressed like anyone else of that era." FLDS dress for members evolved as time passed. Early Short Creek community leaders taught that members should dress in the style of long, Mormon "priesthood" religious undergarments worn by mainstream LDS denominations up until the 1920s. By the later part of the twentieth century, this more conservative style of modesty became increasingly common, through custom and eventually through official edicts by the denomination's leadership.

Property ownership
The land and houses occupied by the FLDS Church on the Utah/Arizona border are owned by the United Effort Plan (UEP), which was once a subsidiary organization of the church. The UEP also owns most of the property of the businesses that are controlled by FLDS Church members in that area. The church views this "United Order" as a means of living the traditional Latter Day Saint doctrine of the "Law of Consecration". The Attorney General of Utah filed a lawsuit and seized the holdings of the UEP for the current residents of Colorado City and Hildale. The Attorney General is seeking to distribute the assets of the UEP to the FLDS Church members and ex-members who contributed to the UEP. In 2005, a court order froze the UEP pending a resolution of the lawsuit. At the time of the court order, the UEP was worth $100 million.

Home schooling
In 2000, the Colorado City Unified School District had more than 1,200 students. When Warren Jeffs ordered that FLDS Church members remove their children from public schools, the number declined to around 250.

Temple worship
The FLDS Church is the seventh Latter Day Saint denomination to have built a temple.

Criticism

Plural marriage

At the time of his death, FLDS Church leader Rulon Jeffs was confirmed to have married 22 women and fathered more than 60 children. It was estimated in 2018 that Warren Jeffs might have over 79 wives. Because the type of polygamy which is practiced is actually polygyny, critics of this lifestyle claim that the practice of it inevitably leads to bride shortages, child marriages, incest, and child abuse.

Critics of the FLDS Church point out that its members violate laws when they practice polygamy. Additionally, critics of the FLDS Church claim that incest and child sexual abuse are also prevalent among its members.

In 2015, Lyle Jeffs' estranged wife Charlene Jeffs claimed in a custody dispute that the FLDS Church currently enforces a doctrine which only allows women to have sex with men who are members of the group which is appointed to be "seed bearers", defined as "elect" men of a "worthy blood line chosen by the Priesthood to impregnate" women. Under this doctrine, men no longer are allowed to have children with their wives. Charlene Jeffs wrote in her custody petition: "It is the husband's responsibility to hold the hands of their wives while the seed bearer 'spreads his seed'. In layman terms, the husband is required to sit in the room while the chosen seed bearer, or a couple of them, rape his wife or wives." She also described the "Law of Sarah", in which FLDS women perform sex acts on each other in order to prepare for a sexual encounter with a man who is in the FLDS leadership. Lorin Holm, who claimed to have been part of Jeffs' "inner circle" before he was excommunicated from the group in 2011, later described the "Law of Sarah" practice in Jeffs' community as being akin to a lesbian sex show with Jeffs participating and sermonizing. Holm also said that mothers who would not take part were sent away to "redeem themselves", and their children were given to other women. This interpretation of the "Law of Sarah" differs from the description of it which was given in the 1843 polygamy revelation of Joseph Smith, because Smith only referred to it as a basis for consent to polygamous marriages by wives.

In 2022, FLDS Church leader Samuel Bateman was found to have 20 wives, which included underage girls, and, according to his family, also sought to marry his teenage daughter. According to criminal charges which were filed against him for destroying evidence linked to a federal investigation on sexual abuses, Bateman, who acted as the self-proclaimed "prophet" of a Colorado City-based splinter sect of the FLDS Church, used his position in the church to also sexually abuse 10 underage girls who he took as his wives in "atonement" ceremonies.

Forced marriage 

The FLDS Church has been suspected of trafficking underage female children across state lines, and it has also been suspected of trafficking underage girls across the U.S. borders with Canada and Mexico, for the purpose of sometimes involuntary plural marriage and child sexual abuse. The Royal Canadian Mounted Police also suspects that the FLDS Church trafficked more than 30 underage girls from Canada to the United States between the late 1990s and 2006 so they could be entered into polygamous marriages. RCMP spokesman Dan Moskaluk said of the activities of the FLDS Church: "In essence, it's human trafficking in connection with illicit sexual activity." According to the Vancouver Sun, it is unclear whether Canada's anti-human trafficking statute can be effectively applied against the FLDS Church's pre-2005 activities, as it may not apply retroactively. An earlier three-year-long investigation by local authorities in British Columbia into allegations of sexual abuse, human trafficking, and forced marriages by the FLDS resulted in no charges, but did result in legislative change.

Welfare receipts
FLDS Church leaders have encouraged their flock to take advantage of government assistance in the form of welfare and the WIC (woman-infant-child) programs. Since the government only recognizes one woman as the legal wife of a man, the rest of his wives are considered single mothers and as a result, they are eligible to receive government assistance. The more wives and children one has, the more welfare checks and food stamps one can receive. By 2003, for example, more than $6 million in public funds were being channeled into the community of Colorado City, Arizona. In his book Under the Banner of Heaven (p. 15), Jon Krakauer writes that, "Fundamentalists call defrauding the government 'bleeding the beast' and regard it as a virtuous act." Carolyn Campbell ("Inside Polygamy in the '90s", 102) adds, "The attitude of some polygamists is 'the government is untrustworthy and corrupt, and I'm above it, but give me those food stamps and free medical care.

Lost boys

Former members have reported that the FLDS Church has excommunicated more than 400 teenage boys for offenses such as dating or listening to rock music. Some former members claim that the real reason for these excommunications is the fact that there are not enough women for each male to receive three or more wives. Six men, aged 18 to 22, filed a conspiracy lawsuit against Jeffs and Sam Barlow, a former Mohave County deputy sheriff and close associate of Jeffs, for the "systematic excommunication" of young men to reduce competition for wives.

Boys in the FLDS sect of Mormonism have been kicked out even at the young age of 15 years old. With the few experiences they have with the world outside of the FLDS, they are left to fend for themselves. Lost boys tend to stay around the area of Hildale, Utah. As they are banished from the world they know they are thrown into situations and things they were never familiar with. Most of those who are banished tend to delve into things such as partying and alcohol.

Racism

In its Spring 2005 Intelligence Report, the Southern Poverty Law Center added the FLDS Church to its list of hate groups because of the church's racist doctrines, which include its fierce condemnation of interracial relationships. Warren Jeffs has said, "the black race is the people through which the devil has always been able to bring evil unto the earth".

Blood atonement
Former FLDS Church member Robert Richter reported to the Phoenix New Times that Warren Jeffs has repeatedly alluded to the 19th-century teaching of "blood atonement" in church sermons. Under the doctrine of blood atonement, certain serious sins, such as murder, can only be atoned for by the sinner's death.

Birth defects
The Colorado City/Hildale area has the world's highest incidence of fumarase deficiency, an extremely rare genetic disease. Geneticists attribute this to the prevalence of cousin marriages between descendants of two of the town's founders, Joseph Smith Jessop and John Yeates Barlow. It causes encephalopathy, severe intellectual disability, unusual facial features, brain malformation, and epileptic seizures.

Child labor abuses
On April 20, 2015, the U.S. Department of Labor assessed fines which totaled US$1.96 million against a group of FLDS Church members, including Lyle Jeffs, a brother of the church's controversial leader, Warren Jeffs, for alleged child labour violations which were committed during the church's 2012 pecan harvest at an orchard near Hurricane, Utah.

In April 2017, filings in U.S. District Court stated that Paragon Contractors, a company with ties to the FLDS Church, and Brian Jessop agreed to pay $200,000 in federal fines over the following year. These fines were levied against Paragon Contractors because it previously violated federal child labor laws. This settled a dispute with the U.S. Department of Labor hours before Paragon Contractors was due to face a potential contempt of court citation before a federal judge. The company was facing sanctions because in 2012, hundreds of children who were members of the Hildale-based FLDS Church were put to work harvesting pecans on a farm which was located in southern Utah under orders from FLDS Church leaders.

LDS Church's attitude 

The Church of Jesus Christ of Latter-day Saints (LDS Church) has stated that "the polygamists and polygamist organizations in parts of the Western United States and Canada have no affiliation whatsoever with The Church of Jesus Christ of Latter-day Saints", and it has also declared that polygamy is strictly prohibited by the current doctrine of the LDS Church. Additionally, the LDS Church states that the term "Mormon" is incorrectly applied to the FLDS adherents and it also discourages its own members from using the term "Mormon" as a descriptive term for members of the LDS Church themselves.

In popular culture

Popular media, including books and television programs, have focused on the FLDS Church.
 In 2013 and 2014, the TV Channel TLC aired two reality television series named Breaking the Faith and Escaping the Prophet. Both center on members of the FLDS leaving the group and adjusting to the outside world.
 On June 28, 2014, Lifetime premiered a new movie called Outlaw Prophet: Warren Jeffs which stars Tony Goldwyn as Warren Jeffs. Lifetime has also made an original movie titled Escape from Polygamy (2013) which is inspired by the FLDS.
In 2011, the history of the FLDS Church was featured in Escaping Evil: My Life in a Cult on the Crime & Investigation Network cable channel.
On August 29, 2018, Great Big Story uploaded a short documentary-styled cinematic storytelling video titled "She Escaped a Cult and Now Helps Others" as part of its documentary series "Defenders" and follows Briell Decker, one of Warren Jeffs' 79 former wives, in her journey to help others walk out of the terrors that she experienced when she was a member of the church. She started the Short Creek Dream Center with Director Jena Jones to help other ex-FLDS members embrace freedom in one of Warren Jeffs' former homes through giving themon and providing residents with counselling therapy sessions, meals, temporary lodging as well as future job preparations and arrangements.
 In 2017 "Evil Lives Here" (Season 2 Episode 3 'My Brother, the Devil') features Wallace Jeffs, half-brother to Warren Jeffs and nephew Brent Jeffs, revealing some of the horrors of the FLDS Church and the crimes of Warren Jeffs.
 In 2022, Netflix premiered the documentary mini-series Keep Sweet: Pray and Obey which features the rise and fall of Warren Jeffs.

See also

 Big Love
 Caliente, Nevada: FLDS controversy
 Factional breakdown: Mormon fundamentalist sects
 Former FLDS members
 List of Mormon fundamentalist churches
 List of Mormon fundamentalist leaders
 Lost boys
 Sons of Perdition (documentary)
 Under the Banner of Heaven
 Darger family

Notes

Bibliography

Further reading

 .
 .
 

  — An article about Bruce Wisan, who was brought in to try to return property to the members of the FLDS group at Short Creek, and was met with great resistance. As featured on This American Life.
 
 .
 
 .
 Wright, Stuart A. (Editor) and James T. Richardson (Editor) (2011). Saints Under Siege: The Texas State Raid on the Fundamentalist Latter Day Saints. New and Alternative Religions. NYU Press. .

External links

Official sites
 

Journalism
 "Polygamy and Me: Seven months have passed since the polygamist raid in Eldorado, but for one mainstream Mormon, the effects linger,"  by the Dallas Observer's Jesse Hyde

Legal
 In The Matter of The United Effort Plan Trust: Information on Utah Attorney General's lawsuit against the United Effort Plan

Other
 Banking on Heaven (2006)—A documentary film with accusations against the FLDS, by Over the Moon Productions.
 Damned to Heaven (2007)—A documentary film about Colorado City and FLDS Church, by Fresh Produce Media.
 Lifting the Veil of Polygamy (2007)—A documentary film critical of the history and modern-day expressions of Mormon polygamy, including numerous testimonials, by the Main Street Church of Brigham City.

 
Mormon fundamentalist denominations
Mormonism and polygamy
Organizations based in Utah
Christian denominations established in the 20th century
Christian organizations established in 1929
Christian organizations established in 1991
1991 establishments in the United States
1929 establishments in the United States
Organizations that oppose LGBT rights in the United States
Anti-black racism in the United States
White supremacist groups in the United States
Cults